Family Guy: Stewie's Guide to World Domination is an American humor book about Family Guy written by producer Steve Callaghan. The book was first published on 20 October 2005. The plot follows Stewie Griffin's plans on ruling the world, despite his only being a minor.

Plot
Since his birth to Lois and Peter Griffin, Stewie has shown his intentions of world domination, to the extent of storing machine guns and other weapons in his bedroom for usage at whim. Upon deciding people must understand his plans before he can perform them, he discusses his dysfunctional family and modern day society throughout, as well as explaining how he intends to take over the world, as well as his personal beliefs on matters such as his family, love, parenting, work, preschool, pop culture, politics, play and more.

Reception
HarperCollins commented that "this book is for the insufferable child in us all, eager to buck the ways of the old guard or just eager for a laugh". When asked in an interview by HarperCollins why he wrote the book, Callaghan comments: "Well, as I tell my minions, true domination can only result from bearing this single truth in mind: the key to being able to dominate the world is understanding the world around you".

References

2005 books
S
Works about dysfunctional families
Comedy books
HarperCollins books